The Anti-Spam SMTP Proxy (ASSP) is an open-source, Perl based, platform-independent transparent SMTP proxy server.

Features 
Some ASSP's features are:
 Hidden Markov Model spam filtering
 Bayesian spam filtering
 whitelisting
 Penalty Box (PB) trapping
 DNSBL/RBL (Realtime Blackhole Listing)
 URIBL (Uniform Resource Identifier Black Listing)
 Multi-level SPF (Sender Policy Framework) validation and blocking
 DKIM signing and validation
 DMARC validation and reporting
 SRS (Sender Rewriting Scheme) fix-up
 Session Delaying/Greylisting and connection response delaying
 Sender validation and recipient validation
 Multi-level attachment blocking (based on block lists or allow lists or content based executable blocking)
 As well as multiple RFC validation mechanisms.
 Multi-threaded (Since version 2.x)
 Platform independent (Written in Perl)

See also 

Transparent SMTP proxy
SpamAssassin, popular open source spam filtering that uses razor and other techniques to detect spam.
Qpsmtpd, a similar project

External links
 ASSP official homepage
 ASSP sourceforge project page
 Forum
 ASSP Wiki
 ASSP beta development site
 ASSP Deluxe for cPanel/WHM frontend for ASSP

Spam filtering
Perl software
Free email software